Upper Blackville is a small community along the banks of the Miramichi River in Northumberland County, New Brunswick, Canada. Located along Route 8, As of 2013, Upper Blackville consisted of 200 people.

Economy
The economy for this remote area depends on the forestry industry along with salmon fishing, a major tourist attraction for the area.

History

Notable people

See also
List of communities in New Brunswick

References

Communities in Northumberland County, New Brunswick